"Shudhijon Shono" ("Listen, Gentlemen") is a song by Bengali rock band Moheener Ghoraguli, featured on their 1978 debut album, Ajaana UDonto bostu ba Aw-Oo-Baw. Written by Ranjon Ghoshal, composed by Gautam Chattopadhyay, and sung by Tapesh Bandyopadhyay, Tapas Das and Ranjon. The lyrics is a call to the people of the city, while bass guitar carry the music. It was one of the band's initial songs such as "Haay, Bhalobasi" and "Bheshe Ashey Kolkata".

Release
"Shudhijon Shono" was released by Hindusthan Record as an Standard play 7-inch single 45-rpm record with other side contains "Ayee Surey Bohudurey".

Alternative and live versions
In 1999, an Alternative version of "Shudhijon Shono" was released on Khyapar Gaan album, and performed by Krosswindz.

A live version was played at Ambedkar Bhavan, Bangalore in Indian on 17 February 2007 at the First Rock Concert – Remembering Mohiner Ghoraguli by Shilajit Majumdar.

Personnel
 Gautam Chattopadhyay - lead guitar

References

External links

1978 singles
1978 songs
Moheener Ghoraguli songs
Songs written by Ranjon Ghoshal
Bengali-language songs